The 1919 Detroit Heralds season was the 15th season for the Detroit Heralds, an independent American football team. Led by coach Bill Marshall, the team compiled a 1–4–2 record.

The team conducted its first practice of the year, and held tryouts, at Northwestern Field on September 20, 1919. Early signings included Snooks Dowd (Lehigh), Norb Sacksteder (Dayton), and Russ Finsterwald (Syracuse). The team signed several new players in the week after the first practice, including Whipple, who played end for Notre Dame; Devereaux, who played end for Christian Brothers and the Dayton Triangles; Gordon, a tackle who played for Virginia; and Carmen, who played fullback and guard at Vanderbilt. By late September, the Heralds had 42 candidates participating in their practice.

Schedule

Players
 Charlie Carman - guard
 Walker Carpenter - tackle, played college football for John Heisman at Georgia Tech
 Harry Costello - quarterback
 Devereaux - end
 Pat Dunne - fullback
 Russ Finsterwald - quarterback/halfback
 Moose Gardner - tackle/guard
 Charlie Guy - center
 Steamer Horning - tackle
 Jimmy Kelly - halfback
 Kreauz - fullback
 Blake Miller - end
 Norb Sacksteder - halfback
 Straight - guard
 Tandy - guard
 Tolman - fullback
 Ray Whipple - end
 Wyman - end

References 

Detroit Heralds seasons
Detroit Heralds